Glenn J. Elliott (born 25 January 1950) is a former Australian rules footballer. He played for the St Kilda and Melbourne as a centreman.

He was a gifted player whose career peak was in the mid-1970s where he was rated the state's best in the centre. He took over the role of St Kilda's centreman from Ian Stewart after Stewart left the club. Representing Victoria, Elliott won the Simpson Medal in 1976 for best on ground against Western Australia in Perth.

After suffering a knee injury in 1977, he played a season for Melbourne in 1979. Later he moved to Port Adelaide and then coached West Torrens in the South Australian National Football League.

Following a stint as CEO of North Adelaide Football Club, Elliott became CEO of Adelaide United in 2011.

References

External links
 Biography at the St Kilda Football Club website
 

St Kilda Football Club players
Melbourne Football Club players
West Torrens Football Club coaches
Trevor Barker Award winners
Australian rules footballers from Victoria (Australia)
1950 births
Living people